Ni Cong (30 May 1935 – 3 July 2022), courtesy name Yiming, better known by his pen name Ni Kuang (also romanised Ngai Hong, I Kuang and Yi Kuang), was a Hong Kong-American novelist and screenwriter. He wrote over 300 Chinese-language wuxia and science fiction novels, and more than 400 film scripts.

Life 
Ni was born on 30 May 1935, in Shanghai, to a family of intellectuals. He was the fourth child out of seven, and one of his younger siblings is novelist Yi Shu. His parents, who worked as insurance agents, left Shanghai for British Hong Kong in 1950 with his three younger siblings, although Ni and his three older siblings remained in Mainland China. In 1951, at the age of 16, he joined the People's Liberation Army, and was employed as a security officer by Jiangsu provincial public security department in 1952 after receiving training at East China People's Revolution University. In 1955, he volunteered to be assigned to Jalaid Banner, a region in Hulun Buir, Inner Mongolia, as a guard of a local laogai camp.

In 1956, Ni was sentenced to ten years' imprisonment as a counter-revolutionary after he was charged for destruction of public property. Ni claims that he removed wooden planks off a bridge with other soldiers and burned them to keep warm in the winter, and he escaped because he thought he would receive a death sentence after his dog bit the commanding officer who frequently targeted him because of his outspokenness against the political system. In mid-May 1956, Ni fled Inner Mongolia and first went to Anshan to stay with his older brother Ni Yifang, an engineer and a member of the 
Chinese Communist Party. He left a month later and returned to Shanghai, where his remaining family members paid a human smuggler for him to travel to Hong Kong. Ni arrived in Kowloon on 5 July 1957, having passed through Guangzhou and Portuguese Macau. Since then, Ni had never set foot in Mainland China.

Ni's science fiction novels usually take the form of detective/mystery stories featuring extraterrestrial life as a deus ex machina to explain the impossible and implausible. His best known works are the Wisely Series (Wai See-lei 衛斯理) and Dr Yuen (Yuen Chun-hap 原振俠) novel series, both of which have been adapted into films and television series. His criticism of communism is evident in some of these works.

Ni also co-wrote scripts with Chang Cheh for the Shaw Brothers Studio, including for the films One-Armed Swordsman, The Assassin and Crippled Avengers. As the screenwriter for the 1972 film Fist of Fury, he did not receive credit for creating the protagonist, Chen Zhen, who was played by Bruce Lee. The credits listed director Lo Wei as author. Chen Zhen became a popular Chinese culture hero and the subject of numerous remakes and adaptations of Fist of Fury. Notable actors such as Jet Li and Donnie Yen have portrayed Chen Zhen on screen after Bruce Lee.  Ni wrote the screenplay for China's first superhero film Inframan.

Ni was a friend and fan of the wuxia writer Louis Cha. He wrote at least one extended segment in Cha's novel Demi-Gods and Semi-Devils when Cha was on holiday in Europe, although much of his additions were excised in Cha's first revision. Ni, while helping Cha write nearly 40 days of serialisation while Cha was abroad, made A'zi, a character in Demi-Gods and Semi-Devils, blind in the story. Cha had since edited his novel.

In 1992, Ni immigrated to the United States and settled in San Francisco, where he continued his writing career. However, he remigrated to Hong Kong in 2006 because his wife could not adjust to the lifestyle in the United States.

Personal life
Ni was a Protestant Christian convert from Buddhism.

Ni had four brothers and two sisters: Ni Yifang (倪亦方), Ni Yixiu (倪亦秀), Ni Yijian (倪亦儉), Ni Yiping (倪亦平), Isabel Nee (倪亦舒) and Ni Yijing (倪亦靖). He was married to Li Guozhen (李果珍) while his younger brother, Ni Yiping, was married to Li's younger sister.

Ni and Li Guozhen had a son and daughter. Their daughter is Ni Sui (倪穗). Their son,  (倪震), works in the Hong Kong entertainment industry and is married to actress Vivian Chow. He reportedly died from skin cancer at a cancer rehabilitation center in Hong Kong on 3 July 2022 at the age of 87.

Political views 
Ni was a known anti-communist. In an interview, when asked about his feelings regarding injustice in China, he stated that the people would continue suffering as long as the Chinese Communist Party remains in existence. He mentioned that the most important value in the world was individual freedom, which includes respecting others' personal freedom as well.

Filmography

Films 
This is a partial list of films.
 1967 One-Armed Swordsman – Screenwriter.
 1969 The Invincible Fist – Writer
 1986 The Seventh Curse – Dr Yi. The film is an adaptation of author Ni Kuang's Dr. Yuen series of novels.
 1988 Profiles of Pleasure – Yi
 1992 The Cat – Mr Chen

Works

Science fiction series
Wisely Series
Dr Yuen Series 原振侠系列	
天人 Tian Ren
迷路 mi lu
血咒 xue zhou
海異 hai yi
寶狐	
靈椅	
奇緣	
精怪
鬼界	
魔女	
失魂	
降頭
巫艷
愛神	
尋找愛神	
大犯罪者
幽靈星座	
黑暗天使	
迷失樂園	
劫數
快活秘方	
變幻雙星	
血的誘惑	
催命情聖
黑白無常	
自殺陰謀	
假太陽	
無間地獄
人鬼疑雲	
魂飛魄散	
宇宙殺手	
天皇巨星
The Asian Eagle Lo Hoi series 亞洲之鷹羅開系列	
鬼鐘	
妖偶	
魔像	
怪頭
巨龍	
蛇神	
蜂后	
火鳳
飛焰	
夜光	
異人	
死結
解開死結	
困獸	
遊魂	
非人協會系列	
魚人，三千年死人，兩生，主宰，泥沼火人，大鷹		
年輕人與公主系列	
神機，暗算，天敵	，夜歸，四條金龍，消失女神，離魂奇遇，神話世界，足球，寶刀，	手套，大寶藏，尺蠖			
Magnolia, the Lady in Black series 女黑俠木蘭花系列	
巧奪死光錶，血戰黑龍黨，火海生死鬥，海底火龍，地獄門，勇破火箭場，神祕高原，雷庫驚魂，死亡織錦，電眼怪客，冰川亡魂，奪命紅燭，智擒電子盜，死亡爆炸網，殺人獎金，隱形奇人，高空喋血，怒殲赤魔團，連環毒計，秘密黨，旋風神偷，天外恩仇，大破暗殺黨，魔掌餘生，血濺黃金柱，神祕血影掌	，鑽石雷射，北極氫彈戰，潛艇迷宮，玻璃偽鈔模，黑暗歷險，人形飛彈，軍械大盜，斷頭美人魚，蜘蛛陷阱，無敵兇手，沉船明珠，無價奇石，失蹤新娘，怪新郎，金庫奇案，龍宮寶貝，珊瑚古城，獵頭禁地，魔畫，死神宮殿，復活金像，遙控謀殺案，地道奇人，蜜月奇遇，冷血人，生死碧玉，電網火花，古屋奇影，金廟奇佛，天才白癡，生命合同，三屍同行，無風自動，無名怪屍
Teenage Wisely Series 少年衛斯理系列	
少年衛斯理、天外桃源		
浪子高達系列	
珍珠蕩婦、盜屍豔遇、紅粉貓	、血美人、水晶豔女、金球紅唇、微晶之秘、超腦終極戰
俠盜影子系列	
麗人劫、寶石眼
神探高斯系列	
晚禮服,鬼照片,水中寶盒,怪房子,預告,	出術,飛艇,魔鬼的舞蹈,未卜先知,	迷途橫禍,	怪人奇騙,妖女煞星,擒兇記,金髮女,及時趕到,弄假成真,霧夜煞星,催眠之術,奇蹟,粉紅鑽石,太陽神	,金酋長,奇輪,風向,亞洲皇后,	黑美人,閃電天,古墨,三與四

Wuxia novels and others
六指琴魔	
六指琴魔续集
龙虎双剑侠	
八俊杰
宝剑千金	
冰天侠女
长虹贯日	
飞针
故剑	
红镖
火凤凰	
黄土
金腰带	
杀气严霜
铁蝙蝠	
铁手无情
小白凤	
新独臂刀
银剑恨	
哑侠
不了仇	
铁拳
紫青双剑录
通神	
異軍
蛇王石	
創造	
血美人	
心變
一劍情深
情天劍痕
俠血红翎
江湖浪子
紅塵白刃	
飄花劍雨	
慧劍情絲
劍谷幽魂
劍亂情迷
玲瓏雙劍
血掌魅影
玉女金戈
一劍動四方	
一劍振八方
南明潛龍傳	
斷腸刃
虎魄冰魂
飛燕情刀
俠女英魂
倩女情俠
十三太保
太虛幻境
騙徒	
香港怪故事
香港鬼故事	
香港鬼故事·第2集
香港鬼故事·第3集
倪匡談金庸
倪匡鬼話系列
寶寶不要哭、麻將遇鬼記、搖搖搖，搖到外婆橋、倪匡說鬼、自來鬼、見聞傳奇、廁所裡有鬼、城市怪故事
倪匡短篇（全1冊）：
常見的男人與女人故事、陰謀殺人故事、監獄故事、想當年故事、舊貨巷故事、武俠小說人物關係、《聊齋誌異》全盤現代化

倪匡看金庸小說「系列」（全5冊）：我看金庸小說、再看金庸小說、三看金庸小說、四看金庸小說、五看金庸小說。

References

External links 

 
 Ni Kuang at allmovie.com

1935 births
2022 deaths 
Deaths from cancer in Hong Kong 
Deaths from skin cancer
Hong Kong novelists
Chinese science fiction writers
American people of Chinese descent
Converts to Protestantism from Buddhism
Hong Kong Protestants
Writers from Ningbo
Wuxia writers
Chinese male novelists
Chinese anti-communists